Percy Isaac Bugbee was an American academic administrator and mathematics professor who served as the second president of the State University of New York at Oneonta.

Percy Isaac Bugbee was born in Colton, New York to John F. and Clementina P. Gates Bugbee. His family soon moved to Canton, New York. He attended and graduated from St. Lawrence University. While in college, he was a member of the Beta Theta Pi fraternity and the Phi Beta Kappa honor society.

Bugbee was an educator who taught in Colton, and would later serve as principle of schools in Naples, New York and Newark, New York. When the State Normal School at Oneonta (today SUNY Oneonta) opened in 1889, Bugbee become a professor of mathematics there. He would serve in this role until he became the conductor of the New York State Teachers’ Association. In 1898, Bugbee was put in charge of the State Normal School at Oneonta, succeeding James M. Milne. He would serve as the second leader of the school until 1933, when he resigned shortly after the death of his wife, Ida Maria Farns.

Bugbee held many honors, and was a skilled orator. He was a member of the Otsego County Draft Board, was once the President of the Council of Normal School Principals, and served on Oneonta's Board of Education for over two decades.

Bugbee was a Universalist Christian.

References 

1935 deaths
St. Lawrence University alumni
Presidents of campuses of the State University of New York